Odisha Football Club Women is an Indian professional women's football club based in Bhubaneswar, Odisha, that competes in the Odisha Women's League, the state top division league. On 1 July 2022, Indian Super League side Odisha FC, announced the formation of their women's side, Odisha FC Women. Odisha announced the appointment of Crispin Chhetri as it first team head coach on the same day.

Crest, colours and kits

Crest 

On 15 September 2019, Odisha unveiled their official logo embodying the heritage and the culture of the state of Odisha and the vision and the ideology of its parent company, GMS Inc. Design of the crest is inspired from the Chakras or the chariot wheels of the famous Konark Sun Temple, a World Heritage Site in Odisha which represents movement and development; the ship design represents GMS, world’s largest buyer of ships and offshore assets, and the owner of the club.

Records and statistics

Players

First-team squad

Personnel

Current technical staff

Managerial history

Football Sport Management

Management

Board of Directors

Affiliated clubs
The following clubs are affiliated with Odisha FC:
  Watford FC (2021–present)
  Avai FC (2021–present)

Honours

Domestic
 Odisha Women's League
 Champions (1): 2022–23

See also
Odisha FC
Odisha women's football team
Odisha football team
Odisha Women's League
Football Association of Odisha

References

External links

 
Football clubs in Odisha
Indian Women's League clubs
Women's football clubs in India
2022 establishments in Odisha
Association football clubs established in 2022